Lucy Wales is an Australian rules footballer playing for  in the AFL Women's league. Wales was recruited by Hawthorn with the 22nd pick in the 2022 AFL Women's draft. She is the twin sister of  player Stephanie Wales.

AFLW career
Wales debuted for the Hawks in the opening round of season seven, playing in the inaugural team. On debut, she collected 7 disposals and 12 hitouts. Wales earned a rising star nomination in round 7, after a 17 hitout, 10 disposal game against .

Statistics
Statistics are correct to the end of S7 (2022).

|-
| S7 (2022) ||  || 31
| 10 || 0 || 0 || 57 || 40 || 97 || 14 || 44 || 168 || 0.0 || 0.0 || 5.7 || 4.0 || 9.7 || 1.4 || 4.4 || 16.8 || 1
|- class=sortbottom
! colspan=3 | Career
! 10 !! 0 !! 0 !! 57 !! 40 !! 97 !! 14 !! 44 !! 168 !! 0.0 !! 0.0 !! 5.7 !! 4.0 !! 9.7 !! 1.4 !! 4.4 !! 16.8 !! 1
|}

Honours and achievements 
Individual
 Hawthorn games record holder
  record holder for hitouts: 168
  record holder for hitouts in a season: 168 – S7 (2022)
  record holder for hitouts in a game: 24 – S7 (2022)

References

2003 births
Living people
Hawthorn Football Club (AFLW) players
Australian rules footballers from Victoria (Australia)